Cyneheard is an Anglo-Saxon male given name. Notable people with the name include:

 Cyneheard the Ætheling (died 786), the killer of Cynewulf of Wessex
 Cyneheard, an 8th-century Bishop of Winchester